Konstantinos Chatzis (born 22 March 1985) is a Greek professional footballer who plays as a defensive midfielder for Super League 2 club Apollon Larissa, for which he is captain.

Career
He started his career from Olympiacos youth academies, where he stayed almost 4 years (2 as a professional player) and then tried his luck in clubs of lower leagues. In July 2011 he signed a 1+3 years contract with his hometown club AEL after having a successful season with Football League (Greece) team Agrotikos Asteras.

References

ael1964.gr
Στη Λάρισα Χατζής και Καλί

«Κλείνει» Χατζή η ΑΕΛ

1987 births
Living people
Footballers from Larissa
Greek footballers
Association football midfielders
Football League (Greece) players
Gamma Ethniki players
Super League Greece players
Super League Greece 2 players
Kastoria F.C. players
Kalamata F.C. players
Ionikos F.C. players
Diagoras F.C. players
Pierikos F.C. players
Apollon Smyrnis F.C. players
Panachaiki F.C. players
Agrotikos Asteras F.C. players
Apollon Larissa F.C. players